William Mayson Lynch (14 April 1909 – 21 March 1985) was an Australian rules footballer who played with North Melbourne and Essendon in the Victorian Football League (VFL).

Notes

External links 

1909 births
1985 deaths
Australian rules footballers from Melbourne
North Melbourne Football Club players
Essendon Football Club players
Williamstown Football Club players
People from Kensington, Victoria